Albert I, Duke of Lower Bavaria (25 July 1336 – 13 December 1404), was a feudal ruler of the counties of Holland, Hainaut, and Zeeland in the Low Countries. Additionally, he held a portion of the Bavarian province of Straubing, his Bavarian ducal line's appanage and seat, Lower Bavaria.

Biography

Early years 
Albert was born in Munich, the third son of Louis IV, Holy Roman Emperor, by his second wife Margaret II, Countess of Hainaut and Holland. Albert was originally a younger son, apportioned at best an appanage. He was only 10 years old when his father died, leaving most of his Bavarian inheritance to his eldest half-brother, Louis V, Duke of Bavaria, but also some appanages to the younger sons.

His elder brother, William V, Count of Holland, had engaged in a long struggle with their mother, obtaining Holland and Zeeland from her in 1354, and Hainaut on her death in 1356. William was supported by the party of burghers of the cities. They were opposed in this by the Hook faction, the party of disaffected nobles who were supporters of Empress Margaret. Margaret had resigned her sovereignty in favour of her son William V, but the result was a period of great upheavals and chaos which gave rise to the formation of these two opposing parties.

Regent of Holland 
William's insanity resulted in the appointment of the then 22-year-old Albert as governor (or regent or ruwaard) of his brother's territories from 1358 onwards. During Albert's regency, affairs ran smoothly and trade improved. Troubles between the two political parties, the Hoeks ("Hooks") and Kabeljauws ("Cods"), remained barely beneath the surface. William lived for another thirty years. Albert did not formally succeed him until his death in 1388, by which time he had already arranged the marriage of his daughters to a number of Imperial princes and other nobles. The eldest daughter to have children was Margaret; her son Philip III, Duke of Burgundy would ultimately inherit Albert's territories.

Count of Holland 
In Albert's own reign, troubles erupted between the Hoeks and the Kabeljauws because of a woman. Albert always had mistresses, but this time his attentions were drawn to Aleid van Poelgeest, a member of the Kabeljauw party.  She was considered very beautiful and was able to gain political influence which was resented. A plot was hatched among the Hoeks as well as members of Albert's household. On 22 September 1392 Aleid was murdered in The Hague.

In his rage Albert persecuted the Hoeks, by sword and fire, conquering one castle after the other. Even his own son and heir, William, did not feel safe and went to live in Hainault. During his last years, Albert fought the Frisians. They were beaten time and time again, but were never completely conquered.

On Albert's death in 1404, he was succeeded by his eldest son, William. A younger son, John III, became Bishop of Liège. However, on William's death in 1417, a war of succession broke out between John and William's daughter Jacqueline of Hainaut. This would be the last episode of the Hook and Cod wars and would lead to the counties being placed into Burgundian hands.

Family and children

Albert married in Passau after 19 July 1353, Margaret of Brieg from Silesia (1342/43 – 1386), and had seven children, all of whom lived to adulthood:
 Katherine of Bavaria (c. 1361 – 1400, Hattem),  married in Geertruidenberg in 1379 William I of Gelders and Jülich.
 Joanna of Bavaria (c. 1362 – 1386), married Wenceslaus, King of the Romans.
 Margaret of Bavaria (1363 – 23 January 1423, Dijon),  married in Cambrai in 1385 John the Fearless.
 William II, Duke of Bavaria (1365–1417), father of Jacqueline of Hainault.
 Albert II, Duke of Bavaria (1369 – 21 January 1397, Kelheim).
 Joanna Sophia (c. 1373 – 15 November 1410, Vienna), married on 15 June 1395 Albert IV, Duke of Austria.
 John, Count of Holland (1374/76 – 1425), Bishop of Liège.
He also had several illegitimate children.

Albert contracted a second marriage in 1394 in Heusden with Margaret of Cleves (c. 1375 – 1412), sister of Adolph I, Duke of Cleves, but they had no children. He died in The Hague, aged 68.

References

Sources

See also
Counts of Hainaut family tree

|-

|-

1336 births
1404 deaths
14th-century dukes of Bavaria
15th-century dukes of Bavaria
Nobility from Munich
Counts of Holland
Counts of Hainaut
House of Wittelsbach
Knights of the Garter
14th-century people of the Holy Roman Empire
Sons of emperors
Children of Louis IV, Holy Roman Emperor
Sons of kings